Shaddah ("[sign of] emphasis", also called by the verbal noun from the same root, tashdid   "emphasis") is one of the diacritics used with the Arabic alphabet, indicating a geminated consonant. It is functionally equivalent to writing a consonant twice in the orthographies of languages like Latin, Italian, Swedish, and Ancient Greek, and is thus rendered in Latin script in most schemes of Arabic transliteration, e.g.  =  'pomegranates'.

Form

In shape, it is a small letter  s(h)in, standing for shaddah. It was devised for poetry by al-Khalil ibn Ahmad in the eighth century, replacing an earlier dot.

Combination with other diacritics

For example, see the location of the diacritics on the letter   in the following words:

In Unicode representation, the  can appear either before or after the vowel diacritic, and most modern fonts can handle both options. However, in the canonical Unicode ordering the  appears following the vowel diacritic, even though phonetically it should follow directly the consonantal letter.

Significance of marking consonant length

Consonant length in Arabic is contrastive:   means "he studied", while   means "he taught";   means "a youth cried" while   means "a youth was made to cry".

A syllable closed by a long consonant is made a long syllable. This affects both stress and prosody. In Arabic verse, when scanning the meter, a syllable closed by a long consonant is counted as long, just like any other syllable closed by a consonant or a syllable ending in a long vowel:   'Will you not indeed praise...?' is scanned as : short, long, long, short, long, short.

See also
 Arabic diacritics
 Arabic alphabet
 Dagesh ḥazak, a functionally similar diacritic used to indicate gemination in Biblical Hebrew

References

Arabic diacritics